Jack Mcloughlin (born 1 August 2001) is an Australian professional footballer who plays as a midfielder for Hampton & Richmond Borough F.C.. He made his professional debut on the 8th of December 2021 in a FFA Cup match against A-League Men side Sydney FC.

References

External links

2001 births
Living people
Australian soccer players
Association football midfielders
APIA Leichhardt FC players
Sydney Olympic FC players
Central Coast Mariners FC players
Macarthur FC players
National Premier Leagues players